Nüydü (also, Nüydi, Nyugdi, and Nyuydi) is a village and municipality in the Agsu Rayon of Azerbaijan.  It has a population of 577. The municipality consists of the villages of Nüydü, Xasıdərə, Qırlar, Quzey, and Sanqalan.

References 

Populated places in Agsu District